Asuridia is a genus of moths in the subfamily Arctiinae. The genus was erected by George Hampson in 1900.

Species
 Asuridia carnipicta
 Asuridia decussa
 Asuridia metaphaea
 Asuridia miltochristoides
 Asuridia nigriradiata
 Asuridia nigrisparsa
 Asuridia phoenicea
 Asuridia ridibunda
 Asuridia rubripennis
 Asuridia subcruciata
 Asuridia yuennanica

References

Nudariina
Moth genera